Mya Oo (born 25 January 1940) is a Burmese politician and physician. He was a member of the Amyotha Hluttaw, the country's upper house, representing Bago Region's Constituency No. 9 (Paungde, Shwedaung and Thegon Townships). He previously served as Deputy Minister for Health and is a former Rector of University of Medicine 1, Yangon.

Mya Oo was born on 25 January 1940. He is married to Tin Tin Mya, and has 4 children: Tun Tun Oo, Mya Thuza, Mya Thida, and Mya Nanda.

References

Members of the House of Nationalities
1940 births
20th-century Burmese physicians
Union Solidarity and Development Party politicians
Living people
University of Medicine 1, Yangon alumni
Government ministers of Myanmar